The canton of Chablis is an administrative division of the Yonne department, central France. Its borders were modified at the French canton reorganisation which came into effect in March 2015. Its seat is in Chablis.

It consists of the following communes:
 
Aigremont
Angely
Annay-sur-Serein
Annoux
Beine
Béru
Bierry-les-Belles-Fontaines
Blacy
Carisey
Censy
Chablis
La Chapelle-Vaupelteigne
Châtel-Gérard
Chemilly-sur-Serein
Chichée
Chitry
Courgis
Étivey
Fleys
Fontenay-près-Chablis
Fresnes
Grimault
Guillon-Terre-Plaine
L'Isle-sur-Serein
Jouancy
Lichères-près-Aigremont
Lignorelles
Ligny-le-Châtel
Maligny
Marmeaux
Massangis
Méré
Môlay
Montigny-la-Resle
Montréal
Moulins-en-Tonnerrois
Nitry
Noyers
Pasilly
Pisy
Poilly-sur-Serein
Pontigny
Préhy
Rouvray
Saint-André-en-Terre-Plaine
Saint-Cyr-les-Colons
Sainte-Vertu
Santigny
Sarry
Sauvigny-le-Beuréal
Savigny-en-Terre-Plaine
Talcy
Thizy
Varennes
Vassy-sous-Pisy
Venouse
Villeneuve-Saint-Salves
Villy

References

Cantons of Yonne